Félipe Ortiz (born 20 May 1932) is a Guatemalan former sports shooter. He competed in the 300 metre rifle event at the 1968 Summer Olympics.

References

1932 births
Living people
Guatemalan male sport shooters
Olympic shooters of Guatemala
Shooters at the 1968 Summer Olympics
Sportspeople from Guatemala City